The persons listed below have held the office of mayor of Riverside, California, United States, since March 1, 1907, when the city adopted its first charter.

From the time Riverside was incorporated on September 25, 1883, until the city adopted a charter, a board of trustees ran the city.  Unofficially, the president of the board was at times referred to as the mayor.

List of Mayors

References

Bibliography
Brown, John Jr. and Boyd, James. History of San Bernardino and Riverside Counties, Lewis Publishing, 1922. (2010 Nabu Press edition: ; 2012 Hard Press edition (Volume 3))
Fitch, Robert J. Profile of a Century; Riverside County, California, 1893-1993, Riverside County Historical Commission Press, 1993. 
Hall, Joan H. Cottages, Colonials and Community Places of Riverside, California, Highgrove Press, Riverside, CA, 2003. .
Klotz, Esther H. and Joan H. Hall. Adobes, Bungalows, and Mansions of Riverside, California Revisited, Highgrove Press, 2005. .
Patterson, Tom. A Colony For California; Riverside's First Hundred Years, Second Edition, 1996. The Museum Press of the Riverside Museum Associates. .
Paul, Arthur G. Riverside Community Book, A. H. Cawston, 1954.

Citations and notes

See also
Mayoral elections in Riverside, California

External links
City of Riverside, Office of the Mayor

 
Riverside, California
Mayors
M